Hangal Assembly seat is one of the seats in Karnataka Legislative Assembly in India. It is part of Haveri Lok Sabha seat.

Members of Assembly 
 1951: Siddappa Chanabasappa Sidhur (Cong)
1957: Basangouda Rudragouda Patil (Independent)
1962: Gururao Narasingarao Desai (Cong)
1967: P. B. Rudragouda (IND)
1972:S. P. Chandrashekharappa (Cong) 
 1978: Manohar Tahasildar (Congress - Indira) 
 1983: C. M. Udasi, Independent Politician
 1985: C. M. Udasi, Janata Party
 1989: Manohar Tahsildar, INC
 1994: C. M. Udasi, Janata Dal
 1999: Manohar Tahsildar, INC
 2004: C. M. Udasi, BJP
 2008: C. M. Udasi, BJP
 2013: Manohar Tahasildar, INC
 2018: C. M. Udasi, BJP, died in 2021
 2021 (By-Poll): Srinivas Mane, INC.

Election results

2021 By election

2018 Assembly Election

2013 Assembly Election
 Manohar H. Tahashildar (INC) : 66,324 votes
 Udasi C.M (KJP) : 60,638

1967 Assembly Election
 P. B. Rudragouda (IND) : 18,742 votes    
 S. S. Chanabasappa (INC) : 16781

See also 
 List of constituencies of Karnataka Legislative Assembly

References 

Assembly constituencies of Karnataka